Backyard refers to the yard or garden at the back of a house.

(The) Backyard or Back yard may also refer to:

Film
 The Backyard (1920 film), 1920 silent comedy film
The Backyard (2002 film), 2002 wrestling documentary film
 Backyard (film), a 2009 Mexican crime film

Music
 The Backyard (EP), 1984 album by Miracle Legion
"Backyard" (Pebbles song), 1990

Other
 The Backyard (video game), a 1993 educational video game

See also